This is a list of characters in the Avatars trilogy of novels, written by Tui T. Sutherland. The series tells the story of a group teens who are transported into the future and learn that they are Avatars of gods from different pantheons and that they must fight to decide who will become the ruler of all the other gods and humans.

Avatars

Kali

 Pantheon: Indian/Hindu
 Avatar of: Kali, goddess of destruction.
 Description: Kali is an Indian-American living in New York. She works to support her mother and her half-sisters. Her mother doesn't tell her anything about her father. The only thing she has from him is a bone pendant with her name on the back that she wears around her neck. She is easily angered and hates the chaos of New York. Events of destruction seem to follow her. For example, when she was a child, her mother took her to a salon to cut her hair. Kali doesn't want her hair cut and soon the salon gets mysteriously burnt down in a fire. She thinks she is responsible for her stepfather's death, but she later learns that she isn't.
Despite her anger, she can also be quite loving. She takes care of her three half-sisters very dearly. She also takes care of Miracle in the same way.

Diana/Venus
 Pantheon: Greco-Roman
 Avatar of: Diana, goddess of the hunt, chastity and the moon, and Venus, goddess of love.
 Description: Venus is a famous pop star. She has two sides. She loves attention from her fans, but she also loves to be alone. After she meets Gus, she reveals to him that her real name is Diana. Zeus later tells her that they originally chose Diana as the avatar, but put Venus in her body later, so they could make a deal with the Egyptians. In Shadow Falling, Diana is almost killed by Anna, and she travels through many underworlds before being saved by Gus.

Tigre
 Pantheon: Mesoamerican, Incan
 Avatar of: Catequil, god of storms.
 Description: Tigre is a very confused character. He often has dreams in which he kills an old man by turning into a tiger. Whenever he gets agitated, he feels something inside him trying to come out. Thunderstorms also occur when this happens. He runs away from wherever he is when this happens, and wakes up later. He thinks that thunderstorms cause him to turn into killer animals, but he later learns that he is the one creating the thunderstorms.
Tigre is very pessimistic. He believes that people cannot change their fate, and they can only accept what will happen to them. He keeps thinking that he is powerless, but when he meets Oya, she helps him develop his power. Tigre needs someone to guide him. He also desperately wants to be liked.

Gus
 Pantheon: Polynesian
 Avatar of: Oro, god of war.
 Description: Gus is a normal boy who lives in Los Angeles. His parents died in a car crash when he was fourteen. He lives with his older brother, Andrew. He is a geek who watches lots of science fiction movies with his brother.
Gus is the only avatar who wasn't originally meant to be an avatar. The Polynesian pantheon used their last remaining power to push Oro into him through his physical contact with Venus at the moment of extrication, when he saves her from a falling prop. He often fights with Oro for control of his body.

Amon
 Pantheon: Egyptian
 Avatar of: Amon, sun god.
 Description: Amon is an arrogant Egyptian boy. He was contacted early by his pantheon, so he knew that he was an avatar before all the others. He hates Gus because of Diana's interest in him. He gets turned into a stag by Diana in Shadow Falling.

Thor
 Pantheon: Norse
 Avatar of: Thor, god of thunder and lightning.
 Description: Thor is separate from the other avatars since he cannot speak English. The avatars have to get Quetzie to communicate with him. He helps the avatars go to Africa and also takes care of Miracle.

Anna

 Pantheon: Sumerian
 Avatar of: Inanna, goddess of love and war.
 Description: Anna is from Thailand. She comes to New York with Thor, who took her in his chariot. She meets the rest of the avatars and tells them her story. She pretends that she loves Tigre, but she really doesn't. In Kingdom of Twilight, she gets trapped in the underworld by Diana.

Trainers
 Shiva- Indian god of destruction. He enters Kali into the contest without her knowing. He also tries to manipulate her by giving her only her memories as Kali and not as her other incarnations, so that she will focus only on destroying the other avatars.
 Apollo- Greco-Roman god of music, medicine, and the sun. He disagreed with the idea of putting Venus into the avatar with Diana. He helps Diana save Gus in So This Is How It Ends by telling her what to do through her mind. Diana frequently tries to get answers about the contest from him since he cannot lie.
 Tlaloc- Aztec god of rain. He tries to help Tigre develop his powers but fails. He always yells when speaking because he is quite deaf from the centuries of rolling thunder in the Andes. He believes that Tigre is useless and can has very little power.
 Isis- Egyptian goddess of motherhood and fertility. She contacts Amon before the extrication and tells him that he is an avatar. She is jealous of him and likes to be in charge. She doesn't want him to be more powerful than he already is.
 Odin- Norse god of wisdom. He was the one who had the idea for the contest when he had a vision of a fight between Kali and Thor. He was also the one who cast the deciding vote against Loki becoming the Norse avatar, making Loki extremely angry and avengeful.
 Ereshkigal- Sumerian goddess of the underworld. She is the twin sister of Inanna. She disguises herself as Inanna and tells the other avatars that she is an avatar and her name is Ereka. She is jealous of Inanna's power over men and gets very mad at Gus when he rejects her in favor of Diana.

Judges
 Ganesh- Indian god of obstacles, beginnings, intellect and wisdom. He is also the son of Parvati, another incarnation of Kali. He has the head of an elephant.
 Athena- Greco-Roman goddess of war and wisdom. She doesn't know about the secret deal between the Greco-Romans and the Egyptians.
 Itzamna- Mayan creator god.
 Maat- Egyptian god of truth and justice. She, like Athena, doesn't know about the secret deal between the Greco-Romans and the Egyptians.
 Tyr- Norse god of victory.
 Shamash- Sumerian god of justice and the sun. He stops Ereshkigal from killing Gus but does not make any attempt to save him.

Other major characters

Gods and Goddesses
 Dumuzi- Sumerian god of food and vegetation. He is the husband of Inanna. He is forced to go to Irkala, the Sumerian underworld for half the year because he was chosen by Inanna to take her place in the underworld after she angered Ereshkigal. He wants to take revenge on Inanna. He forces Diana to take the objects of power and give them to him so that he will be free and Inanna will have to stay in Irkala.
 Obatala- Father of the orishas, the African spirits of the world. He helps the avatars find a way to save Diana by taking them to Orunmila.
 Oya- The orisha of the hunt, hurricanes, change, etc. She helps Kali and Tigre find Yeshu when he runs away. She is a big admirer of Tigre and helps him develop his powers.
 Orunmila- Orisha of divination. Obatala's brother. He tells the avatars that if Diana makes it to Hades, she will die.
 Trickster- Also referred to as Loki, Eshu, Coyote, and Maui. He is the mysterious god trying to sabotage the contest. He wants revenge on the Norse gods for what they have done to him and also wants chaos and confusion on Earth. He tries to trick the avatars into giving him the power. He is also the father of Miracle.

Creatures
 Quetzie- A neoquetzal, an evolved, giant type of quetzal. She communicates with the avatars through telepathy. She can only be seen by people who she allows to see her. She takes Tigre to New York. She also helps the avatars communicate with Thor.
 Aleph and Bet- Robots living in the Metropolitan Museum of Art. They take care of the art. They want to become real humans. They kill the crystal hunters to help the avatars escape to Africa. In return, Shiva turns them into real humans.
 Pterodolphins- Evolved forms of dolphins which have pterodactyl wings and beaks. They are also different colors like blue, green, yellow and red. Justin and Treasure train them to fight the crystal hunters. Tigre uses the pterodolphins to call Quetzie back to New York in Shadow Falling.
 Crystal hunters- Robots originally created to contain all the memories of a human to replace him after he dies. The creatures became stronger and work together. They roam around preying on humans. They have triangular heads and purple, glowing eyes. They are made of crystals which absorb solar energy during the day. They follow the Boss Hunter.
 Boss Hunter- A giant crystal bird which leads a pack of crystal hunters. The avatars fight one at the end of So This Is How It Ends.

Humans
 Miracle- The last human being ever born. She is a thirteen-year-old girl in New York. She is worshiped by a group of people in New York. They believe that she was sent to save humanity. The gods tell Kali and Tigre that she was just created by them to give the humans false hope. Later, however, Trickster confesses that he is Miracle's father and the gods had nothing to do with it.
 Andrew- Gus' older brother. He takes Gus with him to help as a stage hand at the concert where he meets Venus. When they are transported into the future, Gus and Venus find him living in Kansas.

Minor characters

Gods
 Frey- Norse god of farming and weather. The avatars steal his ship, Skidbladnir to go to Africa.
 Spider Woman- Native American creator goddess. She represents the Native American pantheon when the pantheons meet to decide the contest. She refuses to join the contest.
 Heimdall- The watchman of the gods, who guards the bridge to Asgard. He convinces the other Norse gods not to allow Loki to become the Norse avatar.
 Shango- Orisha of thunder and lightning. He meets the avatars when they arrive at Africa and takes Diana in, but leaves the other avatars at the wall.
 Mawu-Lisa- The Fon god and goddess. They are one being which is half man and half woman. They help Kali, Tigre and Oya find Eshu.
 Xolotl- Aztec god of lightning who guides spirits through the Aztec underworld. He meets Diana in Mictlan, the Aztec underworld.
 Yanluo- King of the Chinese underworld. He judges events in Diana's life, but lets her go free since she isn't Chinese.
 Ox-Head and Horse-Face- The guardians of the Chinese underworld.
 Rohe- Polynesian goddess of the underworld. She tells Diana not to trust Maui.
 Milu- Polynesian king of the underworld. He meets Diana in the Polynesian underworld.
 Tezcatlipoca- A Mayan god. His indestructible mirror creates the illusion of the world where the contest takes place.
 Poseidon- Greek god of the sea. Kali suspects that his trident can break Tezcatlipoca's mirror.
 Amphitrite- Wife of Poseidon. She gives Poseidon's trident to the avatars.

Creatures
 Huginn and Muninn- Two crows. They serve as Odin's spies, flying around and bringing him information.
 Abidemi and Kayode- Elephants who are friends of Obatala. They protect Diana's body while Gus goes into the underworlds to save her.
 Tan- A were-lion who tries to eat Kali, Oya and Tigre by tricking them into going into his cave.

Humans
 Justin and Treasure: Scientists studying the pterodolphins. They train the pterodolphins to fight the crystal hunters. Treasure was the last human born on Earth before Miracle.
 Forever Young and the forever youngermen: The group of people who Tigre meets on his way north. Forever Young and her followers use cosmetic surgery to replace their body parts so that they can stay alive. Forever is very conscious of all the harm that can come to her body and actively tries to prevent it. The youngermen, however, just want to party for their whole lives.
 Always Young: Forever's husband. He doesn't want to stay alive and hates that Forever is trying to keep him alive. Forever wants to use Tigre's liver for him.
 Doug: Venus' manager.
 General Pepper and the subway dwellers: The subway dwellers are the survivors living in the subway tunnels of New York. They worship Miracle and think she was created to save humanity. The leader of the subway dwellers is General Pepper. He is the guardian of the Miracle.
 Bill Nichols: Kali's stepfather. He died a few years after he married Kali's mother. Kali believes that she unintentionally made him sick, but at the end of Kingdom of Twilight, Coyote tells her that she wasn't responsible for his death.
 Amy, Beth and Josephine: Kali's younger half-sisters. They are named after the March sisters in Little Women. Kali is very loving towards them.
 Mrs. Nichols: Kali's mother
 Vicky: Tigre's former girlfriend in Santiago.

Fantasy novel series
Characters in fantasy novel series